The 1956 United States presidential election in New Hampshire took place on November 6, 1956, as part of the 1956 United States presidential election, which was held throughout all contemporary 48 states. Voters chose four representatives, or electors to the Electoral College, who voted for president and vice president.

New Hampshire was won by the Republican nominees, incumbent President Dwight D. Eisenhower of Pennsylvania and his running mate incumbent Vice President Richard Nixon of California. Eisenhower and Nixon defeated the Democratic nominees, former Governor Adlai Stevenson of Illinois and his running mate Senator Estes Kefauver of Tennessee.

Eisenhower took 66.11% of the vote to Stevenson's 33.84%, a margin of 32.27%.

Eisenhower, a war hero and moderate Republican who had pledged to maintain popular New Deal Democratic policies, had wide appeal beyond the boundaries of the traditional Republican coalition. New Hampshire had been narrowly carried by Democrat Franklin Roosevelt 3 out of 4 times, although the state narrowly reverted to the GOP in 1948. However Eisenhower's unique personal appeal brought the state decisively back into the Republican column in both 1952 and 1956,

Eisenhower in 1956 swept every county in New Hampshire, the first Republican to do so since Calvin Coolidge in 1924.

Since Franklin Roosevelt won them in 1932, the counties of Hillsborough County, Strafford County, and Coos County had become reliable New Deal Democratic base counties, voting for Roosevelt all four times as well as for Harry S. Truman. Eisenhower had won back Strafford County and Coos County for the GOP in 1952, however he had lost Hillsborough County, home to Manchester and Nashua, which had been a reliable Democratic bastion since voting for Democrat Al Smith in 1928. However, in 1956, Eisenhower won a majority even in Hillsborough County.

Carroll County had long been the most Republican county in New Hampshire, voting 60% against FDR all four times and over 70% for Thomas E. Dewey in 1948, and would give Eisenhower over 80% of vote in both 1952 and 1956. Eisenhower's 85.38% performance here in 1956 is the strongest performance ever by any candidate in any of New Hampshire's counties, and the only time any candidate has won over 85% in any New Hampshire county.

As Eisenhower won a decisive re-election victory nationally, New Hampshire's results would make the state almost 17% more Republican than the national average, the third most Republican state in the nation behind its Upper New England neighbors Vermont and Maine, a substantial jump from being only the twelfth most Republican state in 1952. The popular incumbent had governed in a very moderate way that appealed to New England voters, and was able to gain dramatically among voters in states like New Hampshire compared to 1952.

Results

Results by county

See also
 Presidency of Dwight D. Eisenhower
 United States presidential elections in New Hampshire

References

1956
New Hamp
1956 New Hampshire elections